The 2014 season of the National League, the third tier of British speedway was contested by nine teams. The Cradley Heathens won the title. The Isle of Wight Islanders were missing from 2012, and the Scunthorpe Stags and Devon Demons have joined the league.

Final table
 PL = Matches; W = Wins; D = Draws; L = Losses; Pts = Total Points

SCORING SYSTEM
Home loss by any number of points = 0
Home draw = 1
Home win by between 1 and 6 points = 2
Home win by 7 points or more = 3
Away loss by 7 points or more = 0
Away loss by 6 points or less = 1
Away draw = 2
Away win by between 1 and 6 points = 3
Away win by 7 points or more = 4

Play Offs
Top four teams race off in two-legged semi-finals and final to decide the championship. Cradley Heathens defeated Coventry Storm in the final.

Semi-finals

Final

Final Leading averages

National League Knockout Cup
The 2014 National League Knockout Cup was the 17th edition of the Knockout Cup for tier three teams. Cradley Heathens were the winners for the second successive year.

First round

Quarter-finals

Semi-finals

Final

Team lineups and final averages

Buxton Hitmen

Tony Atkin 8.14
Liam Carr 8.00
Adam Extance 5.08
Ryan Blacklock 4.55
Tom Woolley 4.11
Sean Phillips 3.00
Stefan Farnaby 3.00

Coventry Storm

Oliver Greenwood 9.22
James Sarjeant 8.67
Stefan Nielsen 8.38
Luke Crang 7.37
Dan Greenwood 7.27
Luke Priest 6.37
Ryan Terry-Daley 4.68
Martin Knuckey 4.55

Cradley Heathens

Steve Worrall 10.46
Paul Starke 9.75
Max Clegg 8.58
Tom Perry 8.21
Nathan Greaves 7.12
Matt Williamson 6.60
Dan Phillips 4.98

Devon Demons

Tim Webster 8.74
Ben Reade 7.70
Matt Bates 6.27
James Shanes 6.14
Lee Smart 5.76
Luke Chessell 5.62
Richard Andrews 4.41
Danny Stoneman 4.20
Tyler Govier 3.00

Kent Kings

Simon Lambert 9.14
Ben Morley 9.06
Benji Compton 8.95
David Mason 7.38
Aaron Baseby 6.58
Danny Ayres 4.47
Daniel Blake 3.40
Brandon Freemantle 3.00
Jason Garrad 3.00

King's Lynn Young Stars

Lewis Rose 10.82
Darren Mallett 7.40
James Cockle 7.32
Tom Stokes 6.95
Kyle Hughes 6.22
Marc Owen 6.11
Scott Campos 5.53
Josh Bailey 4.07

Mildenhall Fen Tigers

Danny Halsey 9.23
Joe Jacobs 8.63
Josh Bates 7.68
Connor Coles 6.65
Brendan Johnson 6.21
Connor Mountain 5.54
Jack Kingston 4.90

Scunthorpe Stags

Sam Chapman 5.45
Steven Jones 4.90
Arron Mogridge 4.36
Danno Verge 3.57
Reece Downs 3.33
Liam Sanderson 3.00
Ryan MacDonald 3.00
Michael Neale 3.00

Stoke Potters

Ben Wilson 9.04
Jon Armstrong 7.94
Ben Hopwood 7.28
Lee Payne 7.10
Chris Widman 4.81
Rob Shuttleworth 3.75
Adam Kirby 3.68
James McBain 3.00

Development Leagues

Midland Development League

Northern Junior League

See also
List of United Kingdom Speedway League Champions
Knockout Cup (speedway)

References

Speedway National League
Speedway National League
Speedway National League